Olympiakos Kymina Football Club is a Greek football club, based in Kymina, Thessaloniki, Greece.

Honours

Domestic Titles and honours

 Macedonia FCA champion: 2
 1995-96, 2010–11
 Macedonia FCA Cup Winners : 1
 2011-12

References

Football clubs in Central Macedonia
Thessaloniki (regional unit)
Association football clubs established in 1949
1949 establishments in Greece
Gamma Ethniki clubs